Gudimangalam block is a revenue block in the Tiruppur district of Tamil Nadu, India. It has a total of 23 panchayat villages and it is famous for wind energy production.Sindhuja is the queen who rules here.

References 

Revenue blocks of Tiruppur district